Bo Ma is a 2014 Burmese psycho drama film, written and directed by Na Gyi, starring Ye Deight, Phway Phway and Aye Mya Phyu. The film is produced by Pin Lel Film Production and premiered in Myanmar on December 12, 2014.

Plot 
Jeep Too lost his childhood friend, Bo Ma nine years ago. To this day, he is seeing Bo Ma around him. He is talking with her, arguing with her and even fighting with her sometimes. But people don't see Bo Ma. Only Jeep Too sees her. Being a medical student, Jeep Too understands his own condition and is seeing a therapist. There he meets another patient, Potae who is suffering from emotional coma. They are drawn to each other and spend some time together each day. Jeep Too starts to feel guilty for spending time with Potae and Bo Ma acts out. They fight. Everything is happening in his own mind. But very real for Jeep Too. Watching Jeep Too being very emotional, Potae envies Jeep Too as she couldn't feel any emotion since the car accident that kill her parents and brother. Potae sticks with Jeep Too, hoping she might get some emotion out of their relationship. The odd duo has to go through the puzzle called life to reach their destiny.

Cast
Ye Deight as Jeep Too
Phway Phway as Potae
Aye Mya Phyu as Bo Ma

External links 
 Bo Ma on IMDb

References

2014 films
2010s Burmese-language films
Burmese drama films
Films shot in Myanmar